Iopentol (trade name Imagopaque) is a pharmaceutical drug that was used as a radiocontrast agent for X-ray imaging in Europe.

Medical uses
Uses included arteriography (imaging of arteries), venography (imaging of the veins) and CT scan enhancement, urography (imaging of the urinary system), arthrography (imaging of the joints), endoscopic retrograde cholangiopancreatography (ERCP; imaging of bile and pancreatic duct), hysterosalpingography (imaging of the uterus and Fallopian tubes), and gastrointestinal studies.

It can be injected into blood vessels or body cavities or given by mouth.

Contraindications
Hysterosalpingography is contraindicated during acute inflammation in the pelvic region.

Adverse effects
Adverse effects include nausea, vomiting, headache, as well as low or high blood pressure or heart rate. Allergy-like reactions such as rashes are usually mild; glottal edema, shock and cardiac arrest are rare.

Interactions 

Iodine-131, a radioactive isotope used for thyroid imaging (scintigraphy) and therapy of thyroid cancers, can be less effective when used within two to six weeks after application of iopentol because of residual iodine in the body.

Pharmacology

Chemistry and mechanism of action

Iopentol is an iodine-containing, water-soluble radiocontrast agent. The iodine atoms readily absorb X-rays, resulting in a higher contrast of X-ray images. It has a low osmolality, meaning that the solution has a relatively low concentration of molecules; this is usually associated with fewer adverse effects than high-osmolality contrast agents.

A phase III clinical trial concluded that iopentol produces images of a similarly high quality as iohexol, and that it is equally well tolerated by patients.

Pharmacokinetics
After intravenous injection, iopentol is distributed in the extracellular space. Its binding to plasma proteins is very low. The substance is not metabolized, but excreted in unchanged form via the kidneys, exclusively by glomerular filtration. Only 2% are excreted in the faeces. The biological half-life is two hours.

References 

Radiocontrast agents
Benzamides
Acetanilides
Iodoarenes